The 1957 All-Ireland Senior Hurling Championship was the 71st staging of the All-Ireland hurling championship since its establishment by the Gaelic Athletic Association in 1887. The championship began on 14 April 1957 and ended on 1 September 1957.

Wexford were the defending champions, however, they were defeated in the provincial campaign. Kilkenny won the All-Ireland following a 4-10 to 3-12 defeat of Waterford.

Rule changes

Prior to the start of the championship the Galway county board put down a motion at the Gaelic Athletic Association's (GAA) annual congress seeking immediate entry to the Leinster championship.  Since 1922 Galway's hurlers had no competition in the Connacht championship and, as a result, they gained automatic entry to the All-Ireland semi-final every year.  This format was seen as hindering the team's chances, however, by being included in the Leinster championship Galway could possibly have more competitive championship games every year.  The motion at congress was eventually withdrawn and the existing format remained intact.

Teams

A total of fourteen teams contested the championship, including all of the teams that participated in the 1956 championship. Kerry returned to the championship after a prolonged absence.

Team summaries

Fixtures

Leinster Senior Hurling Championship

First round

Second round

Semi-finals

Final

Munster Senior Hurling Championship

First round

Semi-final

Final

All-Ireland Senior Hurling Championship

Semi-final

Final

Championship statistics

Top scorers

Top scorers overall

Top scorers in a single game

Scoring

Widest winning margin: 19 points 
Kilkenny 6-9 : 1-5 Wexford  (Leinster final, 4 August 1957)
Most goals in a match: 9 
Waterford 4-12 : 5-5 Limerick (Munster semi-final, 16 June 1957)
Most points in a match: 22 
Kilkenny 4-10 : 3-12 Waterford (All-Ireland final, 1 September 1957)
Most goals by one team in a match: 6 
Kilkenny 6-9 : 1-5 Wexford (Leinster final, 4 August 1957)
Most goals scored by a losing team: 5 
Limerick 5-5 : 4-12 Waterford (Munster semi-final, 16 June 1957)
Most points scored by a losing team: 12 
Waterford 3-12 : 4-10 Kilkenny (All-Ireland final, 1 September 1957)

Miscellaneous

 The English actor John Gregson joined the Kilkenny team during the parade at the start of the All-Ireland final as part of his role as a hurler in the film Rooney.
 Kerry make their first appearance in the Munster Senior Championship since 1945.

Sources

 Corry, Eoghan, The GAA Book of Lists (Hodder Headline Ireland, 2005).
 Donegan, Des, The Complete Handbook of Gaelic Games (DBA Publications Limited, 2005).

References

1957